World Telemarking Championships is the official event to award the titles of World Champions in telemarking. The World Championships is organized every odd year. It started in 1987 in Hemsedal.

Championships

References

External links 
 Results

 
Telemarking